William Wyatt Hudd (28 November 1901 – 5 August 1960) was an Australian rules footballer who played with Geelong, Essendon and Hawthorn in the Victorian Football League (VFL).

Football
Mostly a defender, Hudd started his career at Queenscliff before moving to Geelong and becoming a half back flanker in their 1925 premiership side.

He joined Essendon in 1926, spending two seasons there before taking a break from the VFL and playing at VFA club Yarraville.

In 1929 he returned to the league with Hawthorn, playing for two years there and then moving to Sandringham before retiring in 1931 after 83 VFL games.

Notes

References
Holmesby, Russell and Main, Jim (2007). The Encyclopedia of AFL Footballers. 7th ed. Melbourne: Bas Publishing.

External links

1901 births
1960 deaths
Australian rules footballers from Victoria (Australia)
Australian Rules footballers: place kick exponents
Geelong Football Club players
Geelong Football Club Premiership players
Essendon Football Club players
Hawthorn Football Club players
Yarraville Football Club players
Sandringham Football Club players
One-time VFL/AFL Premiership players